The 2019 season was Surrey Stars' fourth and final season, in which they competed in the final edition of the Women's Cricket Super League, a Twenty20 competition. The side finished fifth in the group stage, winning three of their ten matches.

The side was captained by Nat Sciver and coached by Richard Bedbrook. They played four home matches at Woodbridge Road, Guildford and one at The Oval. Following the season, women's domestic cricket in England was reformed, with the creation of new "regional hubs", with Surrey Stars replaced by South East Stars, which retained some elements of the original team but represent a larger area.

Squad
Surrey Stars' 15-player squad is listed below. Age given is at the start of Surrey Stars' first match of the season (6 August 2019).

Women's Cricket Super League

Season standings

 Advanced to the Final.
 Advanced to the Semi-final.

League stage

Statistics

Batting

Bowling

Fielding

Wicket-keeping

References

Surrey Stars seasons
2019 in English women's cricket